The Theme Building is a structure at Los Angeles International Airport (LAX), considered an architectural example of the Space Age design style. Influenced by "Populuxe" architecture, it is an example of the Mid-century modern design movement later to become known as "Googie". The Airport Theme Building Exterior and Interior was designated as a historic-cultural monument in 1993 by the city.

Architecture 
The distinctive white building resembles a flying saucer that has landed on its four legs. The initial design was created by James Langenheim, of Pereira & Luckman, subsequently taken to fruition by a team of architects and engineers headed by William Pereira and Charles Luckman, that also included Paul Williams and Welton Becket.

The appearance of the building's signature crossed arches as homogeneous structures is a design illusion, created by topping four steel-reinforced concrete legs extending approximately 15 feet above the ground with hollow stucco-covered steel trusses. To counteract earthquake movements, the Theme Building was retrofitted in 2010 with a tuned mass damper without changing its outward appearance.

Constructed near the beginning of the Space Age, the building is an example of how aeronautics and pop culture, design and architecture came together in Los Angeles.

History 
The original design for the airport created by Pereira & Luckman in 1959 had all the terminal buildings and parking structures connected to a huge glass dome, which would serve as a central hub for traffic circulation. The plan was eventually scaled down considerably, and the terminals were constructed elsewhere on the property. The Theme Building was subsequently built to mark the spot intended for the dome structure, as a reminder of the original plan.

There are conflicting reports to whether the restaurant once had a 360 degree rotating floor when it originally opened. However, that is only legend and LAX officials confirmed the restaurant never revolved, yet because of its appearance and views, many visitors “think it revolves.”

The building construction contract was awarded to Robert E. McKee General Contractor, Inc. of El Paso, Texas.

The structure was dedicated on June 25, 1961, by Vice President Lyndon B. Johnson. The Los Angeles City Council designated the building, which lies within the Westchester neighborhood of the city of Los Angeles, a historic-cultural monument (no. 570) in 1993.

A $4 million renovation, with retro-futuristic interior and electric lighting designed by Walt Disney Imagineering, was completed before the Encounter Restaurant opened there in 1997. Visitors are able to take an elevator up to the Observation Level to get a 360-degree view of arriving and departing planes.

After the September 11 attacks, the Observation Level was closed for security reasons. Following a $12.3 million restoration of the building completed in 2010, the observation level re-opened to the public on Saturdays and Sundays starting July 10.
Additionally, on September 9, 2003, a permanent memorial honoring those who perished in the attacks of September 11 was opened on the grounds of the Theme Building.

The Encounter Restaurant closed for business in December 2013 with no future plans to reopen, although the building's observation level is still open on weekends.
Previously, the restaurant was closed in March 2007 for repairs after a half-ton piece of the stucco skin on the upper arches crashed onto the roof of the restaurant, and reopened on November 12, 2007. Delaware North Companies Travel Hospitality Services operated the restaurant. The restaurant being in a non-secure area of the airport, where travelers are reluctant to spend time when a possibly lengthy security checkpoint lay ahead, or leave after being screened and have to go through security again upon returning, was cited as a reason for closing.

In 2018, the Bob Hope USO at LAX relocated to the ground floor of the Theme Building, opening a 7,100 square foot facility described by its president as "the most technologically advanced USO in existence."

See also
Niterói Contemporary Art Museum

References

External links 

Theme Building  – via USC
Theme Building via Emporis

1961 establishments in California
Buildings and structures in Los Angeles
Buildings and structures completed in 1961
Googie architecture in California
Los Angeles Historic-Cultural Monuments
Los Angeles International Airport
Modernist architecture in California
Towers in California
William Pereira buildings
Westchester, Los Angeles
Retrofuturism
Paul Williams (architect) buildings